Arthur Cross may refer to:

Arthur Henry Cross (1884–1965), British recipient of the Victoria Cross
Arthur Lyon Cross, American historian
Geoffrey Cross, Baron Cross of Chelsea (Arthur Geoffrey Neale Cross, 1904–1989), British law lord
Art Cross (1918–2005), American racecar driver